Sally Streff Buzbee is an American journalist and editor and the executive editor of The Washington Post.

Before joining the Post, Buzbee worked at the Associated Press for more than three decades, serving as executive editor and senior vice president for the last  years of her tenure.

Buzbee was born in Walla Walla, Washington. She lived in the Bay Area and the suburbs of Dallas before graduating from high school in Olathe, Kansas. She earned a bachelor's degree from the University of Kansas and joined the Associated Press in 1988. She earned her MBA from Georgetown University.

Buzbee began her career with the Associated Press as a reporter in Topeka and San Diego. She later worked as the organization's Middle East regional editor, based in Cairo. She returned to the United States to be the AP's Washington bureau chief during the 2012 and 2016 elections. In 2017, Buzbee became senior vice president and executive editor of AP.

When Buzbee became executive editor of The Washington Post on June 1, 2021, she was the paper's first female editor-in-chief.

In a November 2021 interview with Kara Swisher, Buzbee said the journalistic independence of the Post from its billionaire owner Jeff Bezos was "never in question at any point" during her hiring process.

Awards 

 2019 William Allen White Award;
 2021 'Badass 50' list.

References

External links
 
 

1960s births
20th-century American journalists
21st-century American journalists
Associated Press reporters
McDonough School of Business alumni
Journalists from Washington (state)
Living people
People from Walla Walla, Washington
University of Kansas alumni
The Washington Post journalists
American women journalists
American women editors
20th-century American women
21st-century American women